Atlético Sport Aviação, best known as ASA, is a football club from Luanda, Angola.

The club was founded in 1953 by a group of workers from TAAG's predecessor DTA. Mr. Jacinto Medina was the first chairman.

Before Angola's independence, the club was known as Atlético Sport Aviação . After independence, it was called Desportivo da TAAG, named after its major sponsor, the Angolan Airlines. In 1992, the club's name was reverted to its original ASA.

The club won its first title, the Angolan Cup, in 1995. Two players from ASA represented Angola at their first World Cup in 2006: Jamba and Love.

Achievements
Angolan League: 3
2002, 2003, 2004.
1965, 1966, 1967, 1968 (colonial champions)

Angolan Cup: 3
1995, 2005, 2010.

Angolan SuperCup: 6
1996, 2003, 2004, 2005, 2006, 2011.

Recent seasons
Atlético Sport Aviação's season-by-season performance since 2011:

 PR = Preliminary round, 1R = First round, GS = Group stage, R32 = Round of 32, R16 = Round of 16, QF = Quarter-finals, SF = Semi-finals

League & Cup Positions

Performance in CAF competitions
CAF Champions League: 4 appearances
2003 – Group Stage (Top 8)
2004 – Second Round
2005 – Second Round
2006 – Preliminary Round

CAF Confederation Cup: 2 appearances
2005 – Intermediate Round
2011 – Preliminary Round

CAF Cup: 3 appearances
1993 – Semi-Finals
2001 – Second Round
2002 – First Round

CAF Cup Winners' Cup: 3 appearances
1982 – First Round
1994 – First Round
1996 – First Round

Stadium
The club plays their home matches at Estádio da Cidadela, which has a maximum capacity of 35,000 people.

Players and staff

Players

Staff

Manager history

Other sports
ASA Basketball
ASA Handball

See also
 Girabola
 Gira Angola

External links
 Girabola.com profile
 Zerozero.pt profile
 Facebook profile

References

 RSSSF

 
Association football clubs established in 1953
Aviacao
Aviacao
1953 establishments in Angola
Sports clubs in Angola
Works association football teams